Paolo Malacarne (born 4 January 1947) is an Italian sprint canoer who competed in the early 1970s. He was eliminated in the semifinals of K-2 1000 m event at the 1972 Summer Olympics in Munich.

References

External links
Sports-reference.com profile

1947 births
Canoeists at the 1972 Summer Olympics
Italian male canoeists
Living people
Olympic canoeists of Italy
20th-century Italian people